Shamsabad (also Romanized as Shamsābād; also known as Māflū) is a village in Frughan Rural District, Rud Ab District, Sabzevar County, Razavi Khorasan Province, Iran. At the 2006 census, its population was 600, in 180 families.

References 

Populated places in Sabzevar County